MEVGAL (Macedonian Milk Industry) is a Greek brand of dairy products company, the largest in Northern Greece and the third largest producer of fresh dairy products in the country. Its name is an acronym for Macedonian Milk Industry (Greek: Μακεδονική Βιομηχανία Γάλακτος, ΜΕΒΓΑΛ).  It is headquartered in Koufalia in the Thessaloniki regional unit.  It manufactures dairy products that include yogurt, cheese and dairy-based deserts which total up to 170 individual products.

MEVGAL was founded in 1950 in Macedonia where 67% of Greece's fresh cow milk is produced. Its workforce consists of around 1,200 people. It purchases its raw products from up to 1,600 local farms based exclusively in Greece's north province of Macedonia. Its main market is through the local Greek outlets but it also exports to 23 countries around the world.

Since 2003 it expanded in the production of fruit juices and fruit drinks.

Logo
Its logo has a blue circle with its name emblazoned across it in white Greek letters.

Products
Beautiful - yogurt
Harmony - low-fat yogurt range
Makedoniko - cheese brand since 1965
Feta Mevgal - Feta cheese & more

External links
  Homepage Mevgal

Food and drink companies of Greece
Greek brands
Food and drink companies established in 1950
Companies based in Thessaloniki
Dairy products companies of Greece
1950 establishments in Greece